Gavan Kola may refer to:
 Gavan Kola, Babol Kenar
 Gavan Kola, Gatab